Demey is a Brussels Metro station on the eastern branch of line 5. It is located in the municipality of Auderghem, in the eastern part of Brussels, Belgium. It is named after a former Mayor of Auderghem, Gustave Demey.

The station opened in 1977. Until the opening of the extension to Herrmann-Debroux in 1985, Demey station was the eastern terminus of line 1A. This part of line 1A became part of line 5 in April 2009.

External links

Brussels metro stations
Railway stations opened in 1977
1977 establishments in Belgium
Auderghem